Bendigo Province was an electorate of the Victorian Legislative Council 
. It was created in the redistribution of provinces in June 1904, North Central Province being abolished. Bendigo Province itself was abolished in 1988.

Members
These were members of the upper house province of the Victorian Parliament. The bicameral system of government commenced in November 1856.

Election results

References

Former electoral provinces of Victoria (Australia)
1904 establishments in Australia
1988 disestablishments in Australia